Harshavardhana (IAST Harṣa-vardhana; c. 590–647 CE) was a Pushyabhuti emperor who ruled northern India from 606 to 647 CE. He was the son of Prabhakaravardhana who had defeated the Alchon Hun invaders, and the younger brother of Rajyavardhana, a king of Thanesar, present-day Haryana.

At the height of Harsha's power, his territory covered much of north and northwestern India, with the Narmada River as its southern boundary. He eventually made Kanauj (in present Uttar Pradesh state) his capital, and ruled till 647 CE. Harsha was defeated by the Emperor Pulakeshin II of the Chalukya dynasty in the Battle of Narmada, when he tried to expand his empire into the southern peninsula of India.

The peace and prosperity that prevailed made his court a centre of cosmopolitanism, attracting scholars, artists and religious visitors from far and wide. The Chinese traveller Xuanzang visited the court of Harsha and wrote a very favourable account of him (as Shiladitya), praising his justice and generosity. His biography Harshacharita ("Deeds of Harsha") written by Sanskrit poet Banabhatta, describes his association with Thanesar, besides mentioning the defence wall, a moat and the palace with a two-storied Dhavalagriha (white mansion).

Early life 

Much of the information about Harsha's youth comes from the account of Bāṇabhaṭṭa. Harsha was the second son of Prabhakarvardhana, king of Thanesar. After the downfall of the Gupta Empire in the middle of the 6th century, North India was split into several independent kingdoms. The northern and western regions of India passed into the hands of a dozen or more feudatory states. Prabhakara Vardhana, the ruler of Sthanvisvara, who belonged to the Vardhana family, extended his control over neighbouring states. Prabhakar Vardhana was the first king of the Vardhana dynasty with his capital at Thaneswar. After Prabhakar Vardhana's death in 605, his eldest son, Rajya Vardhana, ascended the throne. Harsha Vardhana was Rajya Vardhana's younger brother. This period of kings from the same line has been referred to as the Vardhana dynasty in many publications.

At the time of Hiuen Tsang's visit, Kanauj was the capital of Raja Harshvardhan, the most powerful sovereign in Northern India. 

K.P. Jaiswal in Imperial History of India, says that according to a 7-8th century Buddhist text, Mañjuśrī-mūla-Kalpa, Harsha was born of King Vishnu (Vardhana) and his family was of Vaishya caste. This is supported by some more writers.

Ascension

Harsha's sister Rajyashri had been married to the Maukhari king, Grahavarman. This king, some years later, had been defeated and killed by king Devagupta of Malwa and after his death Rajyashri had been cast into prison by the victor. Harsha's brother, Rajya Vardhana, then the king at Thanesar, could not accept this affront on his family.  So he marched against Devagupta and defeated him. However, Shashanka, king of Gauda in Eastern Bengal, then entered Magadha as a friend of Rajyavardhana, but in secret alliance with the Malwa king. Accordingly, Shashanka treacherously murdered Rajyavardhana.  In the meantime, Rajyasri escaped into forests. On hearing about the murder of his brother, Harsha resolved at once to march against the treacherous king of Gauda, but this campaign remained inconclusive and beyond a point he turned back. Harsha ascended the throne at the age of 16.  His first responsibility was to rescue his sister and to avenge the killings of his brother and brother-in-law. He rescued his sister when she was about to immolate herself.

Reign
As North India reverted to small republics and small monarchical states ruled by Gupta rulers after the fall of the prior Gupta Empire, Harsha united the small republics from Punjab to central India, and their representatives crowned him king at an assembly in April 606 giving him the title of Maharaja. Harsha established an empire that brought all of northern India under his control. The peace and prosperity that prevailed made his court a centre of cosmopolitanism, attracting scholars, artists and religious visitors from far and wide. The Chinese traveller Xuanzang visited the court of Harsha, and wrote a very favourable account of him, praising his justice and generosity.

Pulakeshin II repelled an invasion led by Harsha on the banks of Narmada in the winter of 618–619. Pulakeshin then entered into a treaty with Harsha, with the Narmada River designated as the border between the Chalukya Empire and that of Harshavardhana.

Xuanzang describes the event thus:

 "Shiladityaraja (i.e., Harsha), filled with confidence, marched at the head of his troops to contend with this prince (i.e., Pulakeshin); but he was unable to prevail upon or subjugate him".

In 648, Tang dynasty emperor Tang Taizong sent Wang Xuance to India in response to emperor Harsha having sent an ambassador to China. However once in India he discovered Harsha had died and the new king Aluonashun (supposedly Arunāsva) attacked Wang and his 30 mounted subordinates. This led to Wang Xuance escaping to Tibet and then mounting a joint expendition of over 7,000 Nepalese mounted infantry and 1,200 Tibetan infantry and attack on the Indian state on June 16. The success of this attack won Xuance the prestigious title of the "Grand Master for the Closing Court." He also secured a reported Buddhist relic for China. 2,000 prisoners were taken from Magadha by the Nepali and Tibetan forces under Wang. Tibetan and Chinese writings document describe Wang Xuance's raid on India with Tibetan soldiers. Nepal had been subdued by the Tibetan King Songtsen. The Indian pretender was among the captives. The war happened in 649. Taizong's grave had a statue of the Indian pretender. The pretender's name was recorded in Chinese records as "Na-fu-ti O-lo-na-shuen" (Dinafudi is probably a reference to Tirabhukti)

During Harshvardhan's rule Vardhan dynasty's geographical boundaries was spread from North to South, Nepal to Narmada river and East to West from Assam to Gujarat. He had a  friendly relations with King of Kamrup, Bhaskarvarman and sent his envoy in the court of Chinese King, formed friendly relations. Harshvardhan established state's capital at Kannauj.  He use to spend major part of state's income to welfare of his subjects. He use to donate his wealth after every 5 years.

Religion

Like many other ancient Indian rulers, Harsha was eclectic in his religious views and practices. His seals describe his ancestors as sun-worshippers, his elder brother as a Buddhist, and himself as a Shaivite. His land grant inscriptions describe him as Parama-maheshvara (supreme devotee of Shiva). His court poet Bana also describes him as a Shaivite.

Harsha's play Nāgānanda tells the story of the Bodhisattva Jīmūtavāhavana, and the invocatory verse at the beginning is dedicated to the Buddha, described in the act of vanquishing Māra (so much so that the two verses, together with a third, are also preserved separately in Tibetan translation as the *Mārajit-stotra. Shiva's consort Gauri plays an important role in the play, and raises the hero to life using her divine power.

According to the Chinese Buddhist traveler Xuanzang, Harsha was a devout Buddhist. Xuanzang states that Harsha banned animal slaughter for food, and built monasteries at the places visited by Gautama Buddha. He erected several thousand 100-feet high stupas on the banks of the Ganges river, and built well-maintained hospices for travellers and poor people on highways across India. He organized an annual assembly of global scholars, and bestowed charitable alms on them. Every five years, he held a great assembly called Moksha. Xuanzang also describes a 21-day religious festival organized by Harsha in Kannauj; during this festival, Harsha and his subordinate kings performed daily rituals before a life-sized golden statue of the Buddha.

Since Harsha's own records describe him as Shaivite, his conversion to Buddhism would have happened, if at all, in the later part of his life. Even Xuanzang states that Harsha patronised scholars of all religions, not just Buddhist monks. According to historians such as S. R. Goyal and S. V. Sohoni, Harsha was personally a Shaivite and his patronage to Buddhists misled Xuanzang to portray him as a Buddhist.

Literary prowess 
 

Harsha is widely believed to be the author of three Sanskrit plays Ratnavali, Nagananda and Priyadarsika. While some believe (e.g., Mammata in Kavyaprakasha) that it was Dhāvaka, one of Harsha's court poets, who wrote the plays as a paid commission, Wendy Doniger is "persuaded, however, that king Harsha really wrote the plays ... himself."

In popular culture
A 1926 Indian silent film, Samrat Shiladitya, about the emperor was directed by Mohan Dayaram Bhavnani.

See also

 Surasena Kingdom
 History of India

References

Further reading

 Reddy, Krishna (2011), Indian History, Tata McGraw-Hill Education Private Limited, New Delhi
 Price, Pamela (2007), Early Medieval India, HIS2172 - Periodic Evaluation, University of Oslo
 "Conquests of Siladitya in the south"  by S. Srikanta Sastri

Ancient Indian dramatists and playwrights
People from Kurukshetra district
6th-century Indian monarchs
7th-century Indian monarchs
Pushyabhuti dynasty
Indian male dramatists and playwrights
Indian Buddhist monarchs